Blake Ellender Lively ( Brown; born August 25, 1987) is an American actress. Born in Los Angeles, Lively is the daughter of actor Ernie Lively, and made her professional debut in his directorial project Sandman (1998). She starred as Bridget Vreeland in The Sisterhood of the Traveling Pants (2005) alongside its sequel The Sisterhood of the Traveling Pants 2 (2008) to commercial success. She appeared opposite Justin Long in the comedy Accepted (2006) and gained notability and widespread recognition for her portrayal of Serena van der Woodsen in the CW teen drama television series Gossip Girl (2007–2012).

She has appeared in romantic comedies including New York, I Love You (2008) and The Private Lives of Pippa Lee (2009). Lively starred opposite Ben Affleck in the crime thriller The Town (2010) and appeared with her future husband Ryan Reynolds in Green Lantern (2011). She was in the ensemble cast of Savages (2012) and garnered acclaim for portraying the titular character in romantic fantasy The Age of Adaline (2015). She appeared in survivor horror film The Shallows (2016) and psychological drama All I See Is You (2016). She starred opposite Anna Kendrick in the box-office hit A Simple Favor (2018), and in The Rhythm Section (2020), where she received critical praise.

Early life
Lively was born Blake Ellender Brown on August 25, 1987, in the Tarzana neighborhood of Los Angeles, California. Her mother, Elaine, worked as a talent scout, and her father, Ernie Lively, was an actor. Lively was named after her grandmother's brother. She has an older brother, Eric, and three half-siblings from her mother's previous marriage, Lori, Robyn, and Jason. Her parents and siblings have all worked in the entertainment industry.

During her childhood, Lively accompanied her parents to the acting classes they taught, as they did not want to leave her with a babysitter. She said that watching her parents teach helped her learn the "drills" and gain confidence as she got older and began working in the industry. She made her professional debut at age 10, when she appeared in the 1998 film Sandman, directed by Lively's father. She describes her role as a "bit part". She was initially not particularly interested in acting and wanted to attend Stanford University.

She attended Burbank High School and graduated in 2005, where she was a cheerleader, a member of the championship choir, and class president. Her elder brother asked his talent agent to send her to several auditions in the summer months. She was subsequently cast as Bridget in The Sisterhood of the Traveling Pants (2005) and filmed her scenes between her junior and senior years of high school.

Career

2005–2006: Career beginnings
The Sisterhood of the Traveling Pants was released in 2005.  Lively's performance earned her a nomination for a Teen Choice Award for "Choice Movie Breakout – Female. In 2006, Lively co-starred with Justin Long in Accepted, and Lively had minor roles in the horror film, Simon Says. Accepted was not well received by critics, but Lively's performance was, earning her a 'Breakthrough Award' from Hollywood Life. Lively starred in Elvis and Anabelle (2007) as Anabelle, a bulimic girl who hoped to win a beauty pageant. Lively said of getting into character for the role that she had "shed serious weight" for her height. She stated that that process was difficult for her because food is "the No. 1 love of my life." MovieLine.com praised her performance in the film and credited it as having been her "breakthrough role".

2007–2012: Gossip Girl
Lively was cast in The CW's series Gossip Girl, based on the novel series of the same name by Cecily von Ziegesar, which premiered in September 2007. Already having deferred college for a year, Lively intended to turn the role down and become a student, but was told that she could attend college part-time while filming the show (she later said "This is advice to anyone: when they say, 'We promise, but we can't put it in writing,' there's a reason they can't put it in writing"). She played the role of Serena van der Woodsen in the teen drama until 2012 when the show ended. Her first magazine cover was the November 2007 issue of CosmoGirl, where she discussed her time in high school and her career prior to Gossip Girl.

In 2008, Lively reprised her role as Bridget in the sequel The Sisterhood of the Traveling Pants 2. Similarly to the first film, Lively's performance was positively received by critics. As of November 2008, the film had earned over $44 million at the box office. In 2009, she appeared as Gabrielle DiMarco in the romantic comedy New York, I Love You, a sequel to the 2006 film Paris, je t'aime. Despite positive critical reception, the film failed at the box office.

Lively portrayed the younger version of the titlular character in The Private Lives of Pippa Lee (2009) to critical acclaim. Paul Byrnes, of the Brisbane Times, described Lively's performance in the film as "sensational". In October 2009, Lively began filming her scenes for her role as Kristina "Kris" Coughlin in the 2010 film The Town, based on Chuck Hogan's novel Prince of Thieves. The film, which was directed by and starred Ben Affleck, was released in the United States on September 17, 2010.  On her performance, Variety wrote that Lively was "almost unrecognizable [and] has fierce, pained moments as the moll and single mother .. tossed aside." In December of that year, Lively appeared in the music video for The Lonely Island's "I Just Had Sex" together with Jessica Alba. Lively played Carol Ferris, the female lead and love interest of Hal Jordan in the superhero film Green Lantern, which was released in June 2011. The film grossed a worldwide total of $219,851,172. In 2011 she was featured in the annual Time magazine 100 influential people. Additionally, AskMen.com named her the most desirable woman of 2011 and People magazine named her one of 2012's Most Beautiful at Every Age.

In 2012, she starred in Oliver Stone's Savages alongside Taylor Kitsch, Aaron Johnson, Salma Hayek, and John Travolta. Lively replaced Jennifer Lawrence as Ophelia, after the latter dropped out to do The Hunger Games. HitFix film critic Drew McWeeny said Lively's performance was "smart and sad precisely because she plays O as such a broken, needy little soul". Also that year, she was selected as the face of the new Gucci fragrance, Gucci Premiere. She appeared in a short film ad directed by Nicolas Winding Refn for the fragrance.

2013–present: Film career

In October 2013, Lively was named the new face of L'Oreal, marking her first major makeup campaign. Lively starred in the film The Age of Adaline (2015), opposite Michiel Huisman and Harrison Ford, playing a woman who "stops aging after recovering from a near-fatal accident." The film was a modest commercial success, grossing $65.7 million from a production budget of $25 million. The Atlantic stated that Lively showed her "potential as a leading lady" primarily in the second half of the film, citing her "clipped delivery and coy restraint" as well as her "capable perform[ance]" within the emotional intensity of the film. In 2016, Lively starred in the survival horror film The Shallows. It received positive reviews and Lively's performance was praised by critics. That year, Lively also starred in Woody Allen's romantic comedy film, Café Society which premiered at the 69th Cannes Film Festival and received critical acclaim. Lively enjoyed her experience working with Allen stating, "It's really cool to work with a director who's done so much, because he knows exactly what he wants", adding that he was "very empowering".

Lively starred opposite Jason Clarke in psychological drama All I See Is You (2016), which premiered at the Toronto International Film Festival to mixed reviews. In 2018, Lively starred in the mystery-thriller A Simple Favor, alongside Anna Kendrick and Henry Golding, and directed by Paul Feig. The film was released on September 14 and Lively's performance was acclaimed. Variety wrote that "She has her moments .. many of them physical .. Lively's Emily is both repellent and irresistible." Lively next played the lead, a drug-addicted prostitute turned assassin, in The Rhythm Section, the film adaptation of the Mark Burnell novel of the same name, produced by Barbara Broccoli and Michael G. Wilson, and directed by Reed Morano. The film was released by Paramount Pictures on January 31, 2020. Variety noted Lively's performance as "display[ing] a realistic near-incompetence in the face of danger [that] makes her relatable in ways very few cinematic assassins have ever been."

In May 2021, it was announced that Lively will star in Lady Killer as the lead character, Josie Schuller. Lively made her directorial debut as the co-writer and director of the music video for Taylor Swift's song "I Bet You Think About Me" featuring American singer-songwriter Chris Stapleton, released on November 15, 2021, from Swift's re-recorded album Red (Taylor's Version) (2021). In April 2022, it was announced Lively would make her feature directing debut with an adaptation of the graphic novel Seconds by Bryan Lee O'Malley, with Edgar Wright writing the screenplay and producing. In January 2023, it was announced that Lively will star in the movie adaptation of Colleen Hoover's novel It Ends with Us as the lead character, Lily Bloom.

Other ventures

Betty Buzz
In 2021, Lively launched Betty Buzz, a line of non-alcoholic drink mixers.

Celebrity homemaker
Lively describes herself as a "foodie and cook", and has said Martha Stewart is her "idol". She is also a fan of Nigella Lawson's work. In 2008, Lively baked a cake with Stewart during an episode of The Martha Stewart Show. In 2009, Lively stated that she "hoped one day to have an interior decorating company", citing her love for antiques and fascination with "colors and textures and layering things". In 2010, she attended a tailor-made workshop at Le Cordon Bleu in Paris, and has spoken of her desire to return to the culinary school for further instruction.

She has remarked that, when travelling, she always takes cookery classes to immerse herself in the local culture. In 2010 and again in 2011, Lively spoke publicly of her desire to become a restaurateur. In 2011, she created a s'mores cupcake to be sold at Sprinkles bakeries. In 2012, Lively's wedding reception was featured in Martha Stewart Weddings; food photography was the focal point of the picture spread. In 2013, she appeared in Elle Decor to recount her experiences designing a custom La Cornue oven for her newly purchased Bedford home. In 2013, she filmed a cooking segment for Vogue website, demonstrating how to make a brie pastry. In 2014, she launched Preserve, a digital magazine and e-commerce website with hand-made one-of-a-kind items all selected by Lively; on October 9, 2015, Lively closed the site, stating that it had been launched before it was ready, and that she plans to rebuild and relaunch it properly.

Advocacy
During the 2008 United States presidential election, Lively expressed her support for Barack Obama. Lively and Penn Badgley appeared in a pro-Obama commercial, as part of MoveOn.org's Youth Vote program. The commercial, directed by Doug Liman, aired during Gossip Girl on the CW, MTV and Comedy Central. In 2013, she appeared in a video clip for Gucci's "Chime for Change" campaign that aims to raise funds and awareness of women's issues in the areas of education, health, and justice. In addition, Lively has worked to heighten public awareness of missing and exploited children and on-going efforts of law enforcement on their behalf.

Personal life

From 2007 to 2010, Lively was in a relationship with her Gossip Girl co-star Penn Badgley.

Lively first met Ryan Reynolds in early 2010 while filming Green Lantern, in which they co-starred. They began dating in October 2011 and married on September 9, 2012, at Boone Hall Plantation in Mount Pleasant, South Carolina. They have four children: born December 2014, September 2016, October 2019, and February 2023. The family resides in Pound Ridge, New York. Lively and Reynolds are close friends with singer-songwriter Taylor Swift, who named the characters in her song "Betty" after their daughters.

Filmography

Film

Television

Music videos

Awards and nominations

Explanatory notes

References

External links

 
 
 

1987 births
20th-century American actresses
21st-century American actresses
Actresses from Los Angeles
American child actresses
American film actresses
American people of English descent
American people of German descent
American people of Irish descent
American television actresses
Blake
Living people
People from Tarzana, Los Angeles